Narciso Méndez Bringa (Madrid, 1868 - Madrid, 5 July 1933) was one of the most important Spanish illustrators. His illustrations won two awards in 1906 and 1910 from the National Exhibition of Fine Arts (Spain).

According to García Padrino, " Narciso Méndez Bringa represented the validity of the Nineteenth Century's concept of illustrating texts. Literary or not, his illustrations were vigorous and fully detailed in setting and characterization, with images destined to be printed by xylography". Bringa was also described as "a member of a conservative group of costumbrist artists rooted in the nineteenth-century" and as "an artist he was anchored in a modernist-toned past".

Narciso Méndez Bringa collaborated in numerous magazines including The Ocurrencias, La Ilustración, The Graphic, El Arte Moderno, Caras y Caretas,  La Ilustración Española y Americana, Apuntes, La Ilustración Artística, ABC and Blanco y Negro, in which he was "a constant illustrator of every sort of stories". Bringa was buried in La Almudena Cemetery in Madrid, Spain.

References

Bibliography

External links 

1868 births
1933 deaths
People from Madrid
19th-century Spanish painters
19th-century Spanish male artists
Spanish male painters
20th-century Spanish painters
20th-century Spanish male artists